Speedy homolog E1 (Xenopus laevis) is a protein that in humans is encoded by the SPDYE1 gene.

Function 

This gene is located at chromosome 7p13 which is close to the Williams Beuren syndrome chromosome region 7q11.23.

References

Further reading 

 
 

Genes on human chromosome 7